Vivek Dahiya (born 8 November 1984) is an Indian television actor. He is known for portraying the role of Abhishek Singh (a police officer) in Yeh Hai Mohabbatein, Rajbeer Bundela in Kavach – Kaali Shaktiyon Se and Rajvardhan Suryavanshi in Qayamat Ki Raat. He emerged as winner of the reality series Nach Baliye 8 in 2017. He made his debut in TV industry with Yeh Hai Aashiqui in 2013.

Early life
Dahiya was born on 8 November 1984 in Chandigarh in a Hindu Jat family. He pursued his master's degree M.Sc. in International Business Management from De Montfort University, England.

Vivek: I am a typical Jat and at times I don't have filters

Personal life

On 8 July 2016, Dahiya married his Yeh Hai Mohabbatein co-actor Divyanka Tripathi Dahiya.

Television

Web series

Films

Music videos

Awards

References

External links
 

1984 births
Living people
Male actors from Haryana
People from Sonipat district
Male actors in Hindi television
Male actors from Chandigarh
Alumni of De Montfort University
Actors from Mumbai